Ernakulam Junction railway station (also known as Ernakulam South, code: ERS) is the biggest railway station in the city of Kochi in Kerala, India. Controlling 376 train routes at a time, it is the busiest railway junction station in South India. At  in financial year 2018–19, it is the second largest in terms of passenger revenues in Kerala and the fifth largest in Southern Railway. It is an A1 classified station operated by the Southern Railway zone of the Indian Railways and comes under the Thiruvananthapuram railway division. Ernakulam Junction is also the first fully disabled-friendly railway station in India.

Important trains originating from Ernakulam Junction

The following trains starting from Ernakulam Junction station:

History 
Ernakulam Jn was first opened as Ernakulam South in 1932 when the metre-gauge line then terminating at Ernakulam Terminus railway station (ERG) was extended from Pachalam to the Cochin Harbour Terminus on the Willingdon Island for proximity to the Kochi Port. Ernakulam North, Perumanur (later closed), Mattanchery Halt and CHTS were the newly opened stations on the route. In 1946 the station was converted into broad gauge as part of the Shoranur–CHTS line, linking it directly to the rest of India via the Mangalore–Jolarpet mainline at Shoranur Jn. In 1956 the Ernakulam–Kottayam metre-gauge line was opened and further extended to Kollam in 1958, joining to the Kollam–Trivandrum line, connecting Ernakulam with Trivandrum for the first time.

Since the opening of the Kottayam line made it a junction, Ernakulam South was renamed Ernakulam Junction, and Ernakulam North was renamed Ernakulam Town. This was what made Ernakulam Jn rise to prominence, which was until then just a small wayside station en route to the much busier Cochin Harbour Terminus station. Until 1979 when the Kottayam line was converted into broad gauge, ERS had both broad and metre-gauge tracks. As the coastal line to Alappuzha was opened in 1989, Ernakulam Jn rose to the status of the most premier railway station in central Kerala.

Layout 
Ernakulam Jn is a railway junction with lines branching off from it to four different directions:
 North towards Chennai/Bangalore (via Palakkad) and Mumbai (via Shoranur–Kozhikode)
 South towards Thiruvananthapuram via Alappuzha–Kollam
 South-west towards Willingdon Island and Cochin Harbour Terminus (CHTS)
 East towards Thiruvananthapuram via Kottayam–Kollam
The station has six platforms to handle long-distance trains and local trains and two entrances (the Main entry and the Eastern entry). Its A1 classification is the highest a station can achieve on Indian Railways. It does have all amenities expected out of a major junction including a paid air-conditioned lounge with free WiFi, a library, rest room, children's play areas etc. However, the station lacks the spread-out roominess and large built-up area of similarly large stations. Ernakulam Junction was the first railway station in Kerala to have an escalator. It was installed on 9 September 2013. Currently all its platforms are served by escalators.

See also
Ernakulam Town railway station
Ernakulam Terminus railway station
Cochin Harbour Terminus

References

External links

www.irctc.com

Southern Railway zone

Railway junction stations in Kerala
Railway stations in Kochi
Railway stations opened in 1932
Thiruvananthapuram railway division